Yannick Bangala Litombo (born 12 April 1994) is a Congolese professional footballer who plays as a defender for Tanzanian Premier League club Young Africans and the DR Congo national team.

External links 
 
 

1994 births
Living people
Democratic Republic of the Congo footballers
Democratic Republic of the Congo international footballers
Footballers from Kinshasa
Association football defenders
Daring Club Motema Pembe players
AS Vita Club players
2016 African Nations Championship players
Democratic Republic of the Congo A' international footballers
Democratic Republic of the Congo expatriate sportspeople in Tanzania
Expatriate footballers in Tanzania
Democratic Republic of the Congo expatriate footballers
Young Africans S.C. players